Thirsty Fish is an American alternative hip hop trio based in Los Angeles, California. It consists of the rappers Dumbfoundead, Open Mike Eagle and Psychosiz. Their second album, Watergate, was released on Mush Records in 2011.

Discography

Albums
 Testing the Waters (2007)
 Watergate (2011)

EPs
 Invasion (2013)

Singles
 "Home Movies" (2012)

References

External links
 Thirsty Fish on Mush Records

Alternative hip hop groups
American musical trios
Hip hop groups from California
Musical groups from Los Angeles